Paul Beaven is an Australian former professional rugby league footballer who played in the 1980s. He played for North Sydney, Western Suburbs and Balmain in the NSWRL competition.

Background
Beaven is the younger brother of former rugby league player Mark Beaven.

Playing career
Beaven made his first grade debut for Western Suburbs in round 8 of the 1983 NSWRFL season against South Sydney at Lidcombe Oval. Beaven made four appearances that season as Wests finished with the Wooden Spoon. In 1984, Beaven joined Balmain and played 41 games for the club over five seasons. In 1989, he joined North Sydney and played 18 matches. Beaven's final game in the top grade was a 30-0 loss against Brisbane in round 22 of the 1989 NSWRL season.

References

1964 births
Western Suburbs Magpies players
Balmain Tigers players
North Sydney Bears players
Australian rugby league players
Rugby league centres
Rugby league five-eighths
Living people